was a Japanese hatamoto samurai, physician, diplomat, philosopher, and journalist. He was also known to have used the name .

Biography
His elder brother, was a prominent figure in the Shogunate's system of medical research institutes.

After preparatory study at the  academy run by the Cheng–Zhu scholar , Jōun enrolled as a student at the Yushima Seidō. He soon graduated with excellent grades.

In 1848, Jōun succeeded into the Kurimoto family of physicians, and became a personal physician to the shogun. During that time, he also lectured on medicine.

In 1858, he was ordered to relocate to Ezo and settled in Hakodate, then a major outpost of the Matsumae clan.

In the following years, Jōun devoted himself to the development of Hakodate. Jōun was eventually promoted to head of the Hakodate bugyō, and conducted surveys of Japanese territory on Sakhalin and the Kuril Islands.

In 1863, Jōun was recalled to Edo. As the shogunate appreciated his achievements in Hakodate, he was promoted to the position of head of the Yushima Seidō's Shōheizaka Academy. Around that time Jōun also became a metsuke and was involved in the planning of the Shogunate naval yards. Due to his having developed expertise in military technology, he was rapidly appointed to the post of gaikoku bugyō and then finally kanjō bugyō, offices he held concurrently with his responsibilities as Hakodate bugyō. By 1866, he had formed a close friendship with Oguri Kozukenosuke.

Jōun became acquainted with Mermet de Cachon, the interpreter for Léon Roches, the French representative in Japan, during his time in Hakodate, and he had a good relationship with Roches as a result. Because of this, the shogunate asked Jōun to serve as a bridge between France and Japan. Jōun was thus involved in preparation for the first French military mission to Japan.

Jōun accompanied the delegation of Tokugawa Akitake which visited Paris for the 1867 World Exposition. During his stay in France, he worked on repairing Japanese-French relations, which had deteriorated due to the suspension of loans by France. He was also engaged in diplomatic negotiations with Britain and visited the Japanologist Léon de Rosny. There, he received news from foreign magistrate  of the return of temporal power to the young Emperor Meiji by Tokugawa Yoshinobu.

Jōun returned to Japan on June 24, 1868. Jōun's reputation for genius impressed the revolutionary Imperial government, and he was invited to serve in a new capacity within its fledgling bureaucracy. However, Jōun refused the offer out of loyalty to the Shogunate, issued a formal apology, and went into seclusion.

At the suggestion of Kanagaki Robun, Jōun joined the  newspaper in 1872 as a journalist. In the following year, 1873, he became the chief editor of the mail-order newspaper  and contributed by bringing on students of Fukuzawa Yukichi as reporters.

Around 1894, the twenty-two-year-old Shimazaki Tōson often visited the retired Jōun, who by that time had begun using the name .

He died of bronchitis in 1897 at the age of 76.

Legacy 
Jōun appears under the fictional name  in Shimazaki Tōson's 1929 epic novel Before the Dawn.

References

Further reading

 

1822 births
1897 deaths
Samurai
Japanese diplomats
Japanese journalists
Japanese Buddhists
France–Japan relations
People of the Boshin War
Meiji Restoration
19th-century Japanese physicians
Deaths from bronchitis